Lorena Wiebes (born 17 March 1999) is a Dutch racing cyclist, who currently rides for UCI Women's WorldTeam . She won the gold medal in road cycling at the 2019 European Games, beating her compatriot Marianne Vos in the sprint for the line. In May 2022, Wiebes won all three stages of the RideLondon Classique. In July 2022, she won the first stage of the Tour de France Femmes.

Major results

2016
 1st  Road race, National Junior Road Championships
2017
 1st  Road race, UEC European Junior Road Championships
 1st  Overall Healthy Ageing Tour Juniors
1st  Points classification
1st Stages 2 & 4
 1st Piccolo Trofeo Alfredo Binda
 1st Stage 3 Junior EPZ Omloop van Borsele
 3rd Gent–Wevelgem Juniors
2018
 1st GP Sofie Goos
 1st Salverda Omloop van de IJsseldelta
 1st Rabobank 7-Dorpenomloop Aalburg
 BeNe Ladies Tour
1st  Points classification
1st Stage 2a
 2nd Dwars door de Westhoek
 2nd Omloop van de Westhoek
 3rd Gran Premio Bruno Beghelli
 3rd Veenendaal–Veenendaal Classic
 3rd Flanders Ladies Classic
 3rd Trofee Maarten Wynants
 4th Three Days of Bruges–De Panne
 8th Gooik-Geraardsbergen-Gooik
 8th Le Samyn
 9th Road race, UEC European Road Championships
 10th Drentse Acht van Westerveld
2019
 1st  Road race, European Games
 1st  Road race, National Road Championships
 1st  Overall Tour of Chongming Island
1st  Points classification
1st  Young rider classification
1st Stages 1, 2 & 3
 1st Nokere Koerse voor Dames
 1st EPZ Omloop van Borsele
 1st RideLondon Classique
 1st Diamond Tour
 1st Stage 1 Tour de Yorkshire
 2nd Overall Boels Ladies Tour
1st  Points classification 
1st  Youth classification 
1st Stages 1 & 2
 2nd Gent–Wevelgem
 2nd Three Days of Bruges–De Panne
 2nd Gran Premio Bruno Beghelli
 2nd Dwars door de Westhoek
 5th Overall Tour of Norway
1st  Young rider classification
1st Stage 1
 3rd Vårgårda WestSweden Road Race
 4th Road race, UEC European Road Championships
 5th Salverda Omloop van de IJsseldelta
 8th Overall BeNe Ladies Tour
1st  Points classification
1st Stage 3
 9th Overall Healthy Ageing Tour
1st  Young rider classification
 9th Drentse Acht van Westerveld
2020 
 1st Three Days of Bruges–De Panne
 1st Omloop van het Hageland
 1st Grote Prijs Euromat
 3rd Overall Challenge by La Vuelta
1st  Young rider classification
1st Stage 1 
2021
 1st Ronde van Drenthe
 1st Scheldeprijs
 1st GP Eco-Struct
 1st Dwars door de Westhoek
 1st Diamond Tour
 The Women's Tour
1st  Points classification
1st Stages 4 & 5
 Giro Rosa
1st Stages 5 & 8
 Thüringen Ladies Tour
1st Stages 2 & 6
 1st Prologue Festival Elsy Jacobs
 3rd Overall Belgium Tour
1st  Young rider classification
1st Stage 1 
 3rd Dwars door het Hageland
 5th Nokere Koerse
2022
 1st  Road race, UEC European Road Championships
 1st  Overall RideLondon Classique
1st  Points classification
1st Stages 1, 2 & 3
 The Women's Tour
1st  Points classification
1st Stages 2, 3 & 6
 Tour de France
1st Stage 1 & 5
Held  after Stage 1
Held  after Stage 1
 1st Ronde van Drenthe
 1st Nokere Koerse
 1st Scheldeprijs
 1st GP Oetingen
 2nd Overall Baloise Ladies Tour
1st  Points classification
1st Stages 1, 2, 3a & 4
 2nd Classic Brugge–De Panne
 3rd Road race, National Road Championships
 3rd Omloop Het Nieuwsblad
 3rd GP Eco-Struct
 10th Omloop van het Hageland
2023
 1st Omloop van het Hageland
 1st Ronde van Drenthe
 1st Stage 2 UAE Tour
 2nd Omloop Het Nieuwsblad

Classics results timeline

Major championship results timeline

References

External links
 

1999 births
Cyclists at the 2019 European Games
Dutch Tour de France Femme stage winners
Dutch female cyclists
European Games gold medalists for the Netherlands
European Games medalists in cycling
Living people
People from Mijdrecht
Cyclists from Utrecht (province)
21st-century Dutch women